Jessie Sinclair Litchfield (18 February 1883 – 12 March 1956) was an Australian author and Northern Territory pioneer.

Early life

Litchfield was born on 18 February 1883 at Ashfield to contractor John Phillips and Jean Sinclair (née Reid). Jessie was educated at Neutral Bay Public School and was taught by Mary Cameron. She married Valentine Augustus Litchfield on 21 January 1908, a miner whom she had met on a ship to Darwin. and they moved around the Northern Territory living at West Arm, Anson Bay, Brocks Creek, the Ironblow mine, the Union reefs and Pine Creek.

Career

In 1909 she wrote to the Messenger, a Victorian church newspaper, describing "Chinese and blacks [as] my nearest neighbours", and her reports may have contributed to the establishment of the Australian Inland Mission.

By the time her husband died in 1931, Jessie was a mother of seven and had published Far North Memories based on her experiences. She wrote five books as well as short stories, articles, and verses, and pursued a career as a journalist, becoming editor of the Northern Territory Times and Government Gazette in 1930. The Times was purchased in 1932 by the union-owned Northern Standard, prompting many battles with the conservative Litchfield. She was Darwin press representative for many papers, including Reuters, for six years.

Litchfield was evacuated to Sydney in February 1942 and bought the Roberta Library, a small library which she then relocated and reopened in Darwin upon her return. She campaigned for self-government in the Territory and contested the federal division in 1951. Litchfield was awarded the coronation medal for outstanding service to the Northern Territory in 1953, becoming its first justice of the peace in 1955. She was involved in the founding of the North Australian Monthly in 1954.

Later life

Litchfield died at Richmond on a visit to Melbourne in 1956. She was cremated and her ashes scattered over Darwin. Her estate was placed in trust fund to encourage the development of Australia Literature through The Litchfield Award for Literature, now a part of the Northern Territory Literary Awards administered by Northern Territory Library. 

Litchfield is the subject of a book by Jane Dickinson, Jessie Litchfield, grand old lady of the Territory, published in 1982. She is also the subject of a television documentary produced by Jeannine Baker, Holding a Tiger by the Tail: Jessie Litchfield (Earshot, ABC Radio National, 2015).

Litchfield Place, in the Canberra suburb of Gilmore, is named in her honour.

Publications
 1930 - Far-North memories : being the account of ten years spent on the diamond-drills, and of things that happened in those days
 1952 - Historical review of the Northern Territory

References

Australian women writers
Writers from New South Wales
1883 births
1956 deaths
19th-century Australian women
20th-century Australian women